Monroe County is a county located in the central portion of the U.S. state of Georgia. As of the 2020 census, the population was 27,957. The county seat is Forsyth. The county was created on May 15, 1821. The county was named for James Monroe.

Monroe County is included in the Macon, GA Metropolitan Statistical Area.

Geography
It is located in the Piedmont region of the state.

The vast majority of Monroe County is located in the Upper Ocmulgee River sub-basin of the Altamaha River basin, with just a tiny southwestern corner of the county, west of a line between Yatesville and Culloden, located in the Upper Flint River sub-basin of the ACF River Basin (Apalachicola-Chattahoochee-Flint River Basin).

Major highways

  Interstate 75
  Interstate 475
  U.S. Route 23
  U.S. Route 41
  U.S. Route 341
  State Route 7
  State Route 18
  State Route 19
  State Route 42
  State Route 74
  State Route 83
  State Route 87
  State Route 401 (unsigned designation for I-75)
  State Route 408 (unsigned designation for I-475)

Adjacent counties
Butts County (north)
Jasper County (northeast)
Jones County (east)
Bibb County (southeast)
Crawford County (south)
Upson County (southwest)
Lamar County (west)

Demographics

2000 census
As of the census of 2000, there were 21,757 people, 7,719 households, and 6,005 families living in the county.  The population density was 21/km2 (55/mi2).  There were 8,425 housing units at an average density of 8/km2 (21/mi2).  The racial makeup of the county was 70.36% White, 27.93% Black, 0.35% Native American, 0.34% Asian, 0.03% Pacific Islander, 0.25% from other races, and 0.74% from two or more races.  1.29% of the population were Hispanic or Latino of any race.

There were 7,719 households, out of which 35.80% had children under the age of 18 living with them, 59.60% were married couples living together, 13.80% had a female householder with no husband present, and 22.20% were non-families. 18.90% of all households were made up of individuals, and 7.40% had someone living alone who was 65 years of age or older.  The average household size was 2.74 and the average family size was 3.12.

In the county, the population was spread out, with 26.30% under the age of 18, 8.30% from 18 to 24, 30.40% from 25 to 44, 24.70% from 45 to 64, and 10.30% who were 65 years of age or older.  The median age was 36 years. For every 100 females, there were 99.40 males.  For every 100 females age 18 and over, there were 97.20 males.

The median income for a household in the county was $44,195, and the median income for a family was $51,093. Males had a median income of $34,433 versus $22,146 for females. The per capita income for the county was $19,580.  About 7.30% of families and 9.80% of the population were below the poverty line, including 12.00% of those under age 18 and 13.30% of those age 65 or over.

2010 census
As of the 2010 United States Census, there were 26,424 people, 9,662 households, and 7,157 families living in the county. The racial makeup of the county was 73.3% white, 23.7% black or African American, 0.8% Asian, 0.3% American Indian, 0.9% from other races, and 1.0% from two or more races. Those of Hispanic or Latino origin made up 2.0% of the population. In terms of ancestry, 14.7% were American, 13.1% were English, 9.9% were German, and 9.5% were Irish.

Of the 9,662 households, 33.6% had children under the age of 18 living with them, 56.2% were married couples living together, 13.1% had a female householder with no husband present, 25.9% were non-families, and 21.9% of all households were made up of individuals. The average household size was 2.61 and the average family size was 3.03. The median age was 41.3 years.

The median income for a household in the county was $48,297 and the median income for a family was $61,110. Males had a median income of $41,409 versus $32,810 for females. The per capita income for the county was $23,656. About 9.8% of families and 12.3% of the population were below the poverty line, including 15.3% of those under age 18 and 12.9% of those age 65 or over.

2020 census

As of the 2020 United States census, there were 27,957 people, 9,760 households, and 6,179 families residing in the county.

Communities

Cities
Culloden
Forsyth

Census-designated place
Bolingbroke
Juliette
Smarr

Unincorporated communities

Berner
Blount
Brent
High Falls
Russellville
Strouds

Politics

Education
All parts of the county are in the Monroe County School District.

See also

National Register of Historic Places listings in Monroe County, Georgia
List of counties in Georgia

References

 

 
Georgia (U.S. state) counties
1826 establishments in Georgia (U.S. state)
Populated places established in 1826
Macon metropolitan area, Georgia